Abacetus antiquus is a species of ground beetle in the subfamily Pterostichinae. It was described by Pierre François Marie Auguste Dejean in 1828 and is found in India, Myanmar and Sri Lanka.

References

antiquus
Beetles described in 1828
Insects of India
Insects of Sri Lanka
Insects of Southeast Asia